That Antony Cotton Show is a British comedy chat show that was broadcast on ITV and STV for one series in 2007. It was presented by Coronation Street actor Antony Cotton and aired on weekdays at 5pm. The show was filmed in front of a live audience at the ITV Granada studios in Manchester.

That Antony Cotton Show launched with 2 million viewers (17.6% share of available audience) at 5pm on Monday 13 August 2007. This was significantly up on the slot average of 1.7 million viewers (12.9%). It also attracted more than Channel 4's flagship daytime show, Richard & Judy, which pulled in just 1.1 million viewers (9.7%) at the same time. However, by its third episode, the show had lost 500,000 viewers, drawing 1.5 million and a 13% share.
Viewership continued to fall further for Cotton's show. On 24 August 2007, only 1.1 million (11.5%) tuned in. The show's viewership slumped to below 1.1 million (10.4%) on 11 September 2007.

Initial reports suggested that the show had been recommissioned for a second run, with producers saying they would alter the format for the new series. The show ceased operations on 17 September 2007 after just one series.

Episodes

References

External links

2000s British television talk shows
2007 British television series debuts
2007 British television series endings
ITV (TV network) original programming
British television talk shows